Larry Wayne Arndt (February 25, 1963 – January 3, 2014) was an infielder in Major League Baseball who played for the Oakland Athletics during its 1989 season. Listed at 6' 1", 195 lb., Arndt batted and threw right handed.

Born in Fremont, Ohio, Arndt attended Bowling Green State University, where he enjoyed a successful collegiate career. Arndt left school in 1985 as the team's career leader in runs batted in with 162, winning first-team All-conference honors in 1984 and second-team in 1985.

Arndt was selected by the Athletics in the 26th round of the 1985 MLB Draft. He spent four seasons in the Minor Leagues before joining the big team in June 1989, going 1-for-6 with a run scored in two games. He played his last season with the Triple-A Tacoma Tigers in 1990.

In between, Arndt played winter ball with the Navegantes del Magallanes club of the Venezuelan League in the 1989-90 season.

In 1995, he was inducted into the Bowling Green State University Hall of Fame.

Arndt was a long time resident of Toledo, Ohio, where he died in 2014 at the age of 50.

Sources

External links

1963 births
2014 deaths
Baseball players from Ohio
Huntsville Stars players
Madison Muskies players
Major League Baseball infielders
Medford A's players
Navegantes del Magallanes players
Oakland Athletics players
People from Fremont, Ohio
Sportspeople from Toledo, Ohio
Tacoma Tigers players
American expatriate baseball players in Venezuela